The burqa is worn by women in various countries. Some countries have banned it in government offices, schools, or in public places and streets. 

There are currently 16 states that have banned the burqa and niqab, both Muslim-majority countries and non-Muslim countries, including Tunisia, Austria, Denmark, France, Belgium, Tajikistan, Uzbekistan, Bulgaria, Cameroon, Chad, the Republic of the Congo, Gabon, the Netherlands, China, Morocco, Sri Lanka and Switzerland.

Europe

Austria 

In 2017, a legal ban on face-covering clothing was adopted by the Austrian parliament.

Belgium 

As of 2015, Belgium has specific bans on face-covering dress, such as the niqab or burqa. On 11 July 2017, the European Court of Human Rights upheld Belgium's ban on burqas and full-face veils.

Bulgaria 

In 2016, a ban on the wearing of face-covering clothing in public was adopted by the Bulgarian parliament. The Bulgarian parliament enacted the ban on the basis of security concerns, however the ban stimulated conflict as 10 percent of the country's population identifies as Muslim. Women who violate the burqa ban face fines up to €770 (~US$848) and have their social security benefits suspended.

Denmark 

In autumn 2017, the Danish government considered adopting a law prohibiting people to wear "attire and clothing masking the face in such a way that it impairs recognizability". The proposal was met with support from the three largest political parties  and was passed into law on 31 May 2018, becoming § 134 c of the Danish Penal Code, stating that "[a]ny person who in a public place wears a item of clothing that covers said person's face shall be liable to a fine" with an exception for coverings that serve "a creditable purpose" (e.g. sports equipment, protection against the cold, masks for carnivals, masquerades etc.). The law came into force on 1 August 2018. On the first day of the implementation of the burqa ban, hundreds of protesters rallied wearing face veils in public. According to the ban, wearing a burqa or a niqab in public can lead to a fine of 1000 kroner (~US$156) in case of first time offences, rising to 10,000 kr. (~US$1560) in case of the fourth offence. Under the ban, police are instructed to order women to remove their veils or to leave the public space. Police officers that fail to obey the orders of the ban are subject to be fined.

France 

France is a secular country. One of the key principles of the 1905 French law on the Separation of the Churches and the State is the freedom of religious exercise. At the same time, this law prohibited public servants from wearing any religious signs during work.

In 1994, the French Ministry for Education sent out recommendations to teachers and headteachers to ban the Islamic veil (specified as hijab, niqab, and burka) in educational institutions. According to a 2019 study by the IZA Institute of Labor Economics, a higher proportion of girls of Muslim background born after 1980 graduated from high school, bringing their graduation rates closer to the non-Muslim female cohort. Having a "Muslim background" was defined as having an immigrant father from a predominantly Muslim country (hence, indigenized Muslims with a longer history in France were not considered), as the study was highlighting the "difficulties faced by adolescents with a foreign cultural background in forming their own identity". Males in the Muslim group also had a lower graduation rate than males in the non-Muslim group. While secularism is often criticized for restricting freedom of religion, the study concluded that for the French context, the "implementation of more restrictive policies in French public schools ended up promoting the educational empowerment of some of the most disadvantaged groups of female students".

In 2004, the French law on secularity and conspicuous religious symbols in schools banned most religious signs, including the hijab, from public primary and secondary schools in France. The proposed ban was extremely controversial, with both sides of the political spectrum being split on the issue, some people arguing that the law goes against religious freedom and is racist because it affects mostly Muslim women and Jewish men.

In 2010, a ban on face covering, targeting especially women wearing chador and burqa, was adopted by the French Parliament. According to The Guardian, the "Burqa ban", was challenged and taken to the European Court of Human Rights which upheld the law on 1 July 2014, accepting the argument of the French government that the law was based on "a certain idea of living together". In 2013 "the applicant" stood outside Elysée Palace in niqab and subsequently received a criminal conviction. The French criminal courts noted in 2014 that the lower court was wrong to dismiss her rights covered under article 18 but dismissed her appeal. The French delegation argued that wearing face coverings violated the principle of "living together". Judges Angelika Nussberger and Helena Jäderblom dissented, calling the concept, "far-fetched and vague." Going on to note that the very decision of declaring what a woman is allowed to wear was hypocritical and antithetical to the aim of protecting human rights. The committee came to the determination in 2018 that the case had been incorrectly dismissed after review by a single judge on the grounds that, "the conditions of admissibility laid down in articles 34 and 35 of the Convention [had] not been met." Upon review the committee concluded that the applicants's human rights had been violated under article 18 and 26 of the International Covenant on Civil and Political Rights. The committee dismissed the notion of "living together" as a vague notion not protected under international law.

Ireland

In 2018, the Taoiseach (Prime Minister) Leo Varadkar ruled out a burka ban in Ireland, saying "I don't like it but I think people are entitled to wear what they want to wear. [...] I believe in the freedom of religion. I don't agree with the doctrine of every religion or necessarily any religion, but I do believe in the freedom of religion."

Latvia 

In 2016 The Independent reported that a legal ban of face-covering Islamic clothing was adopted by the Latvian parliament. After long public discussions draft legislation was approved by Latvian government on 22.08.2017, however it was never adopted by the parliament as a law.

Netherlands 

The States General of the Netherlands enacted a ban on face-covering clothing, popularly described as the "burqa ban", in January 2012. The burqa ban came into force on 1 August 2019 in schools, public transport, hospitals and government buildings, but there are doubts over whether it will be applied in practice. Amsterdam Mayor Femke Halsema spoke out in her opposition of the law. She stated that removing someone wearing a burqa from public transport in the capital would not be fitting with current Dutch society. Chairman of the Dutch Public Transport Association Pedro Peters also voiced his opinion on the ban. Peters said: "You are not going to stop the bus for half an hour for someone wearing a burqa", waiting for the police to arrive; "we are also not allowed to refuse anyone because we have a transport obligation". Known officially as the Partial Ban on Face-Covering Clothing Act, the act also details that those who refuse to uncover their faces may pay a fine of at least 150 euros and can be arrested. Dutch police have also stated that enforcing the ban is not a priority, and that they likely would not respond to a complaint within a thirty-minute timeframe.

Norway 

In 2018 the Norwegian parliament voted to ban the burqa in schools and universities.

Sweden 

In December 2019, the municipality of Skurup banned Islamic veils in educational institutions. Earlier, the municipality of Staffanstorp approved a similar ban.

Switzerland 

In a referendum on 7 March 2021, Swiss voters approved a nationwide ban on the burqa, with over 51% of the electorate supporting it.

Earlier, in September 2013, a constitutional referendum in the Canton of Ticino on a popular initiative banning full-face veils was approved with 66.2% of the vote. In May 2017, the Landsgemeinde in the Canton of Glarus rejected adopting a similar measure with about two-thirds of the vote.

In September 2018, the Canton of St Gallen become the second canton in Switzerland to vote in favor of a ban on facial coverings in public with two-thirds casting a ballot in favor.

Muslim world

Algeria

In 2018, the government passed a law banning the wearing of full face-veils, called burqas or niqabs, for female public servants while at work. The Prime Minister at the time, Ahmed Ouyahia, pushed the ban because of his belief that women should be identifiable in the workspace.

Egypt

In 1953, Egyptian leader President Gamal Abdel Nasser was told by the leader of the Muslim Brotherhood that they wanted to enforce the wearing of the hijab, to which Nasser responded: "Sir, I know you have a daughter in college – and she doesn't wear a headscarf or anything! Why don't you make her wear the headscarf? So you can't make one girl, your own daughter, wear it, and yet you want me to go and make ten million women wear it?".

The veil gradually disappeared in the following decades, so much so that by 1958 an article by the United Press (UP) stated that "the veil is unknown here." However, the veil has been having a resurgence since the Iranian Revolution, concomitant with the global revival of Muslim piety. According to The New York Times, as of 2007 about 90 percent of Egyptian women currently wear a headscarf.

Small numbers of women wear the niqab. The secular government does not encourage women to wear it, fearing it will present an Islamic extremist political opposition. In the country, it is negatively associated with Salafist political activism. There has been some restrictions on wearing the hijab by the government, which views hijab as a political symbol. In 2002, two presenters were excluded from a state run TV station for deciding to wear hijab on national television. The American University in Cairo, Cairo University and Helwan University attempted to forbid entry to niqab wearers in 2004 and 2007.

Muhammad Sayyid Tantawy, Grand Imam of al-Azhar, issued a fatwa in October 2009 arguing that veiling of the face is not required under Islam. He had reportedly asked a student to take off her niqab when he spotted her in a classroom, and he told her that the niqab is a cultural tradition without Islamic importance. Government bans on wearing the niqab on college campuses at the University of Cairo and during university exams in 2009 were overturned later. Minister Hany Mahfouz Helal met protests by some human rights and Islamist groups.

Morocco

In Morocco, the headscarf is not forbidden by law, and women are free to choose to wear one. The headscarf is more frequent in the northern regions, small to medium cities and rural regions. As it is not totally widespread, wearing a hijab is considered rather a religious decision. In 2005, a schoolbook for basic religious education was heavily criticized for picturing female children with headscarves, and later the picture of the little girl with the Islamic headscarf was removed from the school books. The headscarf is strongly and implicitly forbidden in Morocco's military and the police.

In January 2017 Morocco banned the manufacturing, marketing and sale of the burqa.

Syria

In 2010, Ghiyath Barakat, Syria's minister of higher education, announced a ban on women wearing full-face veils at universities. The official stated that the face veils ran counter to secular and academic principles of Syria. However, the ban strictly addresses veils that cover the head and mouth, and does not include hijabs, or headscarfs, which most Syrian women wear.

Tajikistan 

In 2017, the government of Tajikistan passed a law requiring people to "stick to traditional national clothes and culture", which has been widely seen as an attempt to prevent women from wearing Islamic clothing, in particular the style of headscarf wrapped under the chin, in contrast to the traditional Tajik headscarf tied behind the head.

Tunisia

On 6 July 2019 the government banned the wearing of the niqab in public institutions citing security reasons.

Africa

Cameroon

On 12 July 2015, two female suicide bombers dressed in burqas blew themselves up in Fotokol, Far North Region, killing 13 people. Following the attacks, since 16 July, Cameroon banned the wearing of full-face veils, including the burqa, in Far North. Governor Midjiyawa Bakari of the mainly Muslim region said the measure was to prevent further attacks.

Chad 

Following a two suicide bombings on 15 June 2015 which killed 33 people in N'Djamena, the government announced on 16 June 2015 the banning of the wearing of the burqa in its territory for security reasons. The 2015 Prime Minister, Kalzeube Pahimi Deubet, called the burqa "camouflage." Women who violate this ban are subject to jail time.

Gabon

On 15 July 2015, Gabon announced a ban on the wearing of full-face veils in public and places of work in response to the Fotokol bombings.

Republic of the Congo

The full-face veil was banned in May 2015 in public places in the Republic of the Congo to "counter terrorism", although there has not been an Islamist attack in the country.

Asia-Pacific

Australia

In September 2011, Australia's most populous state, New South Wales, passed the Identification Legislation Amendment Act 2011 to require a person to remove a face covering if asked by a state official. The law is viewed as a response to a court case of 2011 where a woman in Sydney was convicted of falsely claiming that a traffic policeman had tried to remove her niqab.

The debate in Australia is more about when and where face coverings may legitimately be restricted. In a Western Australian case in July 2010, a woman sought to give evidence in court wearing a niqab. The request was refused on the basis that the jury needs to see the face of the person giving evidence.

China

In 2017, China banned the burqa in the Islamic area of Xinjiang.

Myanmar
 
At a conference in Yangon held by the Organization for the Protection of Race and Religion on 21 June 2015, a group of monks locally called Ma Ba Tha declared that the headscarves "were not in line with school discipline", recommending the Burmese government to ban the wearing of hijabs by Muslim schoolgirls and to ban the butchering of animals on the Eid holiday.

Sri Lanka

A Sri Lankan MP called for both burqa and niqab to be banned from the country in wake of the Easter terror attack which happened on 21 April 2019 during a local parliamentary session.

The Sri Lankan government banned all types of clothing covering the face, including the burqa and niqab, on 29 April 2019.

India

In India, Muslim women are allowed to wear the hijab and/or burqa anytime, anywhere. However, in April 2019, Shiv Sena party member Sanjay Raut called for the burqa to be banned.

In February 2020, Uttar Pradesh's labor minister Raghuraj Singh has called for an outright ban on women wearing burqas, suggesting that terrorists have been using them to elude authorities.

In January 2022, some students in Karnataka asked for special rights to wear the burqa even when educational institutes have a pre-decided rule of wearing uniforms. On 15 March 2022, through a verdict, the Karnataka High Court upheld the hijab ban in educational institutions as a non essential part of Islam and  suggested that wearing hijabs can be restricted in government colleges where uniforms are prescribed and ruled that " prescription of a school uniform " is a "reasonable restriction".

Canada

On 12 December 2011, the Canadian Minister of Citizenship and Immigration issued a decree banning the niqab or any other face-covering garments for women swearing their oath of citizenship; the hijab was not affected. This edict was later overturned by a Court of Appeal on the grounds of being unlawful.

In November 2013, a bill commonly referred to as the Quebec Charter of Values was introduced in the National Assembly of Quebec by the Parti Québécois that would ban overt religious symbols in the Quebec public service. Thus would include universities, hospitals, and public or publicly funded schools and daycares.

In 2014 however, the ruling Parti Québécois was defeated by the Liberal Party of Quebec and no legislation was enacted regarding religious symbols.

In October 2017, Bill 62, a Quebec ban on face covering, made headlines. , the ban has been suspended by at least two judges for violating the Canadian Charter of Rights and Freedoms. It was first suspended in December 2017.

With regards to public opinion, a 27 October 2017 Ipsos poll found that 76% of Quebecers backed Bill 62, with 24% opposing it. The same survey found the 68% of Canadians in general supported a law similar to Bill 62 in their part of Canada. A 27 October Angus Reid Institute poll found that 70% Canadians outside of Quebec supported "legislation similar to Bill 62" where they lived in the country, with 30% opposing it.

As of June 2019, wearing religious symbols is prohibited for certain public servants in positions of authority in Québec: police, judges and teachers.

People such as Tarek Fatah and Ensaf Haidar have called on the burka to be banned.

In 2017, Quebec City Mayor Régis Labeaume said he supports legislation banning the wearing of the niqāb or burqa in public spaces. In a 2017 Canadian poll found that 54% supported banning the burka.

Ban chronology
The table below lists in chronological order states, that are either United Nations (UN) members or have UN observer status, that have completely banned the burqa.

See also

 Women in Islam
 Islam in Europe
 Islamic dress in Europe
 Clothing laws by country
 Headscarf controversy in Turkey
 Hijab controversy in Quebec
 Multiculturalism
 Hijab by country

References

External links

 Burqa ban: What it means for the West – TCN News
 Veil Project – Values, Equality and Differences in Liberal Democracies. Debates about Muslim Headscarves in Europe (University of Vienna)

History of Asian clothing
Islam by country
Islamic female clothing